Hugues Portelli (born 22 December 1947 in Constantine, Algeria) is a member of the Senate of France, representing the Val-d'Oise department. He is a member of the Union for a Popular Movement.

Portelli is also the mayor of Ermont, a city located in the North of Paris (Val-d'Oise department) as well as a Professor of Political science and Constitutional Law at the prestigious Panthéon-Assas University.

External links
Page on the Senate website

1947 births
Living people
People from Constantine, Algeria
Pieds-Noirs
Socialist Party (France) politicians
Union for French Democracy politicians
Union for a Popular Movement politicians
French Senators of the Fifth Republic
Mayors of places in Île-de-France
Academic staff of Paris 2 Panthéon-Assas University
Senators of Val-d'Oise